, sometimes abbreviated Bokutama, is a shōjo manga by Saki Hiwatari. It was published by Hakusensha from 1986 to 1994 in the magazine Hana to Yume and collected in 21 volumes (tankōbon). The series was adapted as a six-part original video animation (OVA) in 1993. It is about six teenagers and a seven-year-old boy who share common dreams about their past lives as alien scientists who observed the Earth from the Moon. Both the anime OVA and manga are licensed for distribution in North America by Viz Media.

A sequel manga, Embraced by the Moonlight, was serialized in the bimonthly Hana to Yume as well as the special edition magazine, Hana to Yume Plus. It has since been followed by I Sing with the Earth.

Plot

The story centers around high-school student Alice Sakaguchi, her seven-year-old next door neighbor, Rin Kobayashi who attends elementary school, and five other teenage students who have recurring collective dreams about a group of alien scientists stationed on the moon observing and collecting data about the Earth.

Initially, when Alice learns that her classmates Jinpachi and Issei have been having common recurring dreams since middle school, she thinks nothing of it until one day she has one of these "moon dreams" herself. Because of the nature of these dreams, the way Issei always dreams as the same person, and Jinpachi as well, now that Alice has provided a third perspective, they start to believe that people who dream as the other four scientists in their "moon dreams" can each be found.

Almost like playing a simple game, the three make plans to seek these other people out in the hopes of making sense of these dreams. After a suggestion from Issei, and a little bit of time and luck, they are finally able to make contact with the other four people. But as the six teenagers and one child start to piece together the chronology and content of their dreams, they began to realize that their "dreams" are not simply dreams, but rather suppressed memories of their past incarnations that ended tragically. And now, as their "game" begins to unravel, the kids must strive to come to terms with what happened in their past lives, as they struggle to prevent their past incarnations' rivalries, jealousies, and dubious actions from taking over their new ones.

Production

Development 
Before starting to work on Please Save My Earth, Saki Hiwatari was exhausted by drawing her previous series Akuma-kun and wanted to create something that would feel "healing" for her to draw. She observed the magnolia tree at her workplace and started off from there. However, when working on the script, she added more suspense. She described working on the series as a result of her fighting with herself over whether she should draw something serious or something funny. Initially, the series was only supposed to last one year.

Publication 

The series was serialized by Hakusensha in the monthly shōjo (aimed at teenage girls) manga magazine Hana to Yume from December 20, 1986 to May 20, 1994. The serial installments were collected, without chapter divisions, in 21 tankōbon volumes. The series was later reissued in 12 bunkoban volumes in 1998.

It is licensed in English in North America by Viz Media, with all volumes translated. The series has also been translated into French, German, Spanish and Italian.

Analysis 
The series mixes dramatic storytelling with comic relief. Many of the jokes in early volumes of the series refer to 1980s anime and manga. Critic Jason Thompson notes that the story becomes more dark and adult-themed from volume 9 on.

The visual style, for example of the character design, changes throughout the series. The character design of Issei's sister Kyoko was influenced by Osamu Tezuka and is a homage to classic style shōjo manga artists such as Miyako Maki, Makoto Takahashi, Hideko Mizuno, and Shotaro Ishinomori.

Anime adaptation 
Please Save My Earth was adapted as an original video animation (OVA) directed by Kazuo Yamazaki and produced by Production I.G. The six-episode OVA anime covers the first 8 volumes in condensed form. It is licensed in English by Viz Media.

 is a 100-minute compilation movie narrated by Alice, reminiscing on the events of the main OVA as she is on her way to meet with Rin in a park.

 contains six music videos with footage not seen in the main OVA and scenes taken from the manga, as well as a slightly different version of the OVA ending sequence, and the ending credits for the image videos.

Reception and legacy
Please Save My Earth was a commercial success upon release. As of 2006, over 15 million copies of Please Save My Earth volumes had sold in Japan, making it one of the best-selling shōjo manga ever. The series was translated into 

Starting in volume 8 of the manga, a disclaimer appeared at the bottom of the first page of every compilation volume, stating that the story was entirely fictional. This was, because Hiwatari received letters from people who were convinced that they had been part of the moon scientist's society (or even one of the moon scientists themselves) and had been reborn on Earth. These disclaimers have since appeared in her others works, most notably on the first pages of each volume of Global Garden.

Several manga artists have cited Please Save My Earth as an influence on them, including Naoko Takeuchi and Bisco Hatori.

Jason Thompson called Please Save My Earth in Manga: The Complete Guide a "masterpiece of young-adult science fiction" and praised Hiwatari's "slow-paced" as well as "consistently rewarding and unpredictable" storytelling.

See also
 The Tale of the Bamboo Cutter - Japanese folktale with elements similar to Please Save My Earth

References

External links
 Official Viz Media manga website
 

1986 manga
1993 anime OVAs
1994 anime OVAs
1995 anime OVAs
Alien visitations in fiction
Environmental fiction books
Films about reincarnation
Hakusensha franchises
Hakusensha manga
Production I.G
Romance anime and manga
Shōjo manga
Supernatural anime and manga
Viz Media anime
Viz Media manga
Extraterrestrials in anime and manga